The Three Fools ( / Trimata glupatsi) is a series of 11 short animated satiric films created and directed by the Bulgarian cartoonist Donyo Donev. The first episode was released in 1970 and the last one in 1990. The screenplays are written by Donyo Donev, Anastas Pavlov, Georgi Chavdarov, Dimo Bolyarov and Georgi Dumanov.

The series uses the typical for Donev simplified lines, deformed speech and interjections as well as drum' and bagpipe' sounds.

Ever since the first episode's release, the films obtained wide popularity and critical acclaim. Each episode alone won at least one international award.

In 1982, the satirical paper “The Three Fools”, named after the characters of the series, was founded with Donyo Donev as editor-in-chief.

Episodes

References

External links
 

1970 films
Film series introduced in 1970
Bulgarian animated films
Bulgarian satirical films
Fictional Bulgarian people
Animated short film series